The 1999 Westar Rules season was the 115th season of the various incarnations of the West Australian Football League and the third as “Westar Rules”. It is most notable for the first winless season in open-age Western Australian football since Midland Junction in their final 1917 season lost all twelve of their games, although South Fremantle in the under-19 1944 competition lost all nineteen of their games. Peel Thunder, who at the completion of the season had won only two of their first sixty Westar Rules matches, achieved the equal second-longest winless season in a major Australian Rules league behind SANFL club Sturt in 1995. Although beforehand most critics thought the Thunder would improve on what they did in their first two seasons, late in the season none of the major Westar Rules writers gave them a chance to win even against second-last East Perth at Rushton Park.

In the process Peel became the first team for fifty-four seasons to fail to score in the first half and suffered the second-worst loss in open-age WA(N)FL football. Amazingly, the Thunder's only near miss was against minor premier South Fremantle in the last round, when they led all day only to lose by seven points. Their inept performances led to controversy concerning the Thunder's existence among both critics and other Westar Rules clubs, which were to come to a tipping point in subsequent WAFC reports on the state of the competition, notably the “Fong Report” after the 2000 season.

Apart from Peel's ignominious season, East Perth, suffering from internal dissent and disputes over where they would play their home matches – Perth Oval was scheduled for redevelopment as a rectangular field for soccer club Perth Glory, – fell from fourth to second last in their worst season since 1989, winning only twice against the top seven clubs. South Fremantle and West Perth established themselves as the competition's heavyweights with a run of spectacular performances. Despite the pre-season loss of Peter Sumich and Scott Watters, the Bulldogs, aided by access to Docker players under the first host club scheme and whose season featured numerous “centenary year” celebrations, won fifteen on end after an opening round defeat and the Falcons lost only once in the final fifteen home-and-away rounds.

Home-and-away season

Round 1 (Easter weekend)

Round 2

Round 3

Round 4 (Anzac Day)

Round 5

Round 6

Round 7

Round 8

Round 9

Round 10 (Foundation Day)

Round 11

Round 12

Round 13

Round 14

Round 15

Round 16

Round 17

Round 18

Round 19

Round 20

Round 21

Round 22

Round 23

Ladder

Finals

Semi-finals

Preliminary final

Grand Final

Notes
Central District in 1964 and several VFA/VFL clubs share the Thunder's ignominy of a 20-game winless season: Sandringham in 1941, Box Hill in 1951, and the Bendigo Diggers in 2001 and 2002.
The only other winless VFL, SANFL or WAFL clubs whose narrowest loss was to the minor premier have been St. Kilda in 1902, whose closest shave was against premiers , also by seven points, and Sturt in 1995, whose narrowest loss was to Central District by 24 points.Both South Fremantle and Perth were formed in 1899, though South Fremantle's ancestry can be traced back to the older Fremantle Football Club.The WA(N)FL/Westar record win with fewer shots is 53 points (with two fewer shots) by Claremont against Perth in 1994, whilst with equal shots the record is fifty points – also by Subiaco against Swan Districts – in 1968.

References

External links
Official WAFL website
Westar Rules Season 1999

West Australian Football League seasons
Westar Rules